Spongiiferula is a Gram-negative, strictly aerobic, rod-shaped, chemoheterotrophic and non-motile genus of bacteria from the family of Flavobacteriaceae with one known species (Spongiiferula fulva). Spongiiferula fulva has been isolated from the marine sponge Rhabdastrella sp.

References

Flavobacteria
Bacteria genera
Monotypic bacteria genera
Taxa described in 2016